Vanpool, Inc. is a Japanese video game Independent, music software, computer software and toy developer. Its employees include Taro Kudou and Kazuyuki Kurashima, both of which worked for the independent game developer Love-de-Lic.

Games
Endonesia (2001 - PlayStation 2)
Coloball 2002 (2002 - PlayStation 2)
Mario & Luigi: Superstar Saga (2003 - Game Boy Advance) (Mini-Games)
Freshly-Picked Tingle's Rosy Rupeeland (2006 - Nintendo DS)
I am a Fish (2007 - mobile phones)
Let's Yoga (2007 - Nintendo DS)
Let's Pilates (2007 - Nintendo DS)
Magician's Quest: Mysterious Times (2008 - Nintendo DS) (Music)
3°C (2009 - Wii (WiiWare)) (Sound Clips)
Dekisugi Tingle Pack (2009 - Nintendo DS (DSiWare))
Irozuki Tingle no Koi no Balloon Trip (2009 - Nintendo DS)
Little King's Story (2009 - Wii) (Sound/Voice Clips))
Wii Play: Motion (2011 - Wii) (Wind Runner Mini-game)
Dillon's Rolling Western (2012 - Nintendo 3DS)
Dillon's Rolling Western: The Last Ranger (2013 - Nintendo 3DS)
Paper Mario: Sticker Star (2012 - Nintendo 3DS) (Direction and script)
Chibi-Robo! Zip Lash (2015 - Nintendo 3DS) (co-developed with Skip Ltd.)
Dillon's Dead-Heat Breakers (2018 - Nintendo 3DS)
Super Kirby Clash (2019 - Nintendo Switch) (co-developed with HAL Laboratory)
Kirby Fighters 2 (2020 - Nintendo Switch) (co-developed with HAL Laboratory)
Kirby and the Forgotten Land (2022 - Nintendo Switch) (co-developed with HAL Laboratory)
Kirby's Return to Dream Land Deluxe (2023 - Nintendo Switch) (co-developed with HAL Laboratory)

References

External links

  

Software companies based in Tokyo
Video game companies of Japan
Video game development companies
Video game companies established in 1999
Vanpool games
Japanese companies established in 1999
Privately held companies of Japan